Raw Sylk is the debut studio album by American rapper Sylk-E. Fyne. It was released on March 24, 1998 through RCA Records with Gerald 'Big Yam' Baillergeau and Victor 'Vino' Merritt producing the entire album.

The album is best remembered for its lead single "Romeo and Juliet", a duet with William "Chill" Warner. The song peaked at #6 on the Billboard Hot 100 and #1 on the Hot Rap Singles and reached gold status two months after its release.

The album, however, did not match "Romeo and Juliet's" success, only making it to 121 on the Billboard 200 and 47 on the R&B charts. The album's failure eventually led to RCA dropping Sylk-E. Fyne from the label.

Track listing

Samples
"Romeo And Juliet"
"Theme From Mahogany (Do You Know Where You're Going To) by Diana Ross
"You Don't Have to Cry" by Rene & Angela
"Grand Jury (Coming Through)"
"I'll Be Good" by Rene & Angela
"Material Girl"
"More Bounce to the Ounce" by Zapp
"I Ain't Down With The System"
"Ready or Not Here I Come (Can't Hide from Love)" by The Delfonics
"Sylk-E.'s Romeo And Juliet (LA Groove)"
"Sun Is Here" by Sun

Personnel
Gerald Baillergeau - producer, executive producer
Mike Concepcion - executive producer
Tony Dawsey - mastering
Kevin Evans - executive producer, A&R
La'Mar Lorraine Johnson - main artist, vocals
Freddie Lee - associate executive producer
Dorothy Low - photography
Victor Merritt - associate executive producer, producer, mixing
Craig Nobles - associate executive producer
Todd Anthony Shaw - featured artist, vocals
William Warner Jr. - featured artist, vocals
Jerome Woods - featured artist, vocals

Charts

References

1998 debut albums
RCA Records albums
Sylk-E. Fyne albums